Mok-dong is a ward of Yangcheon-gu, located in the west of Seoul, South Korea. Commonly referred to as a "special education district", the upper-middle/upper-class neighborhood is best known for its abundance of private institutions, or Hagwons, as well as quality public schools. It is also home to the headquarters of two broadcasting corporations, SBS and CBS (Christian Broadcasting System). Also situated in Mok-dong are the Hyperion Towers, the tallest of which is 69 stories and 256 metres high. The tallest tower, Tower A, is the fifth tallest skyscraper in Seoul and one of the tallest residential buildings globally. During the Joseon Dynasty, it was used as a ranch where horses were grazed by many trees and was now transformed into a wooden area.

History
Historically it was an agricultural area known for horse breeding. In the 1980s it was one of the cheapest residential areas in Seoul due to the pollution of the Anyangcheon river, risk of heavy flooding, and the noise of unauthorized factories. From 1983 when the development plans for the regions were decided, the dong was developed as a high-density residential area by the military government ahead of 1986 Asian Games and  the 1988 Summer Olympics, not only to meet growing housing demands in Seoul, but also to fill the void on the way from the airport to the stadiums. During the early stages of development, original residents of the region protested against official reports that they will be only provided 100,000 won for their relocations, which caused mass protests and led to the recognition of "the right to live" in the country.

Broadcasting institutions
Korea Communications Standards Commission (Office)
SBS Headquarters
Christian Broadcasting System Headquarters

administrative neighborhoods	
mok 1-dong	
mok 2-dong	
mok 3-dong	
mok 4-dong	
mok 5-dong

Education
Yangchung Middle School
Wolchon Middle School

Point of interest
Mokdong Stadium, Mokdong Baseball Stadium and Mokdong Ice Rink
Hyperion Tower
Yongwang mountain
GomTV Studios
Hyundai Department Store, which is built under the Hyperion Tower
Mok-dong station
Sinmokdong station

See also
Administrative divisions of South Korea

References

External links
 Mok 1-dong Resident office center

Neighbourhoods of Yangcheon District